Green Valley School is a private trilingual (German, English, Arabic) school located in Obour City, Cairo. The school was established in 1998 amongst few trilingual schools in Egypt. It offers education from kindergarten stage through secondary education (Thanaweya Amma  ) or IGCSE. Arabic, German and English are taught in parallel.

The school is a partner of Zukunft schools, Germany.

References

External links 

Official Website

Private schools in Cairo
Educational institutions established in 1998
1998 establishments in Egypt
Trilingual schools